Salaam Bombay! is a 1988 Indian Hindi-language drama film, directed, co-written and co-produced by Mira Nair. The screenwriter was Nair's creative collaborator Sooni Taraporevala. This was the first feature film directed by Nair. The film depicts the daily lives of children living in slums in Bombay (now Mumbai), India's largest city. It stars Shafiq Syed, Raghuvir Yadav, Anita Kanwar, Nana Patekar, Hansa Vithal and Chanda Sharma.

Nair's inspiration for the film came from the spirit of Bombay's street children and how they lived. Production began in early 1988, and the film was co-financed by the National Film Development Corporation of India. After being released worldwide on 6 October 1988, the film grossed an estimated  at the overseas box office, against a production budget of only $450,000.

Nominated for the Academy Award for Best International Feature Film at the 61st Academy Awards, the film was India's second film submission to be so nominated. After its initial release on 11 May 1988 at the 1988 Cannes Film Festival, Salaam Bombay! achieved significant critical acclaim. It won the Caméra d'Or and Audience award at the Cannes Film Festival. The film won the National Film Award for Best Feature Film in Hindi, the National Board of Review Award for Best Foreign Language Film and three awards at the Montreal World Film Festival. The film was on the list of "The Best 1,000 Movies Ever Made" by The New York Times.

Plot
Before the start of the film, Krishna has set fire to his elder brother's motorbike as retaliation for being bullied by him. His angry mother has taken him to the nearby Apollo Circus and told him that he can only come home when he earns 500 rupees to pay for the damage. Krishna agrees and starts work for the circus.

The film begins as the circus is packing up to move on to its next site. His boss asks him to run an errand but when Krishna returns he finds that the circus has left. Alone, with nowhere to turn, and without the money to repay his mother, he travels to the nearest big city, Bombay. As soon as he arrives, he is robbed of his few possessions. He follows the thieves, befriends them, and ends up in the city's notorious red-light area of Falkland Road, near the Grant Road Railway Station.

One of the thieves, Chillum, a drug pusher and addict, helps Krishna to get a job at the Grant Road Tea Stall and becomes a mentor of sorts to him. Baba, a local drug dealer, employs addicts like Chillum. Baba's wife, Rekha, is a prostitute and they have a little daughter, Manju. Rekha is annoyed that she has to raise her daughter in such an environment. Baba had promised to start a new life elsewhere, but it is a promise that Baba cannot, or will not, fulfill.

Krishna gets a new name, "Chaipau", and learns to live with it. His goal is still to raise the money he needs to return home, but soon finds out that saving money in his new surroundings is next to impossible. To make matters worse, he has a crush on a young girl named Sola Saal, who has been recently sold to the brothel. He sets fire to her room and attempts to escape with her, but they are caught. The fire causes Krishna to get a severe beating, while Sola Saal, who is considered valuable since she is still a virgin, denies starting the fire and tearfully tries to resist her enslavement. The madame of the house asks Baba to "tame her," which Baba agrees to do.

Meanwhile, Krishna, as well as working at the tea stall, works odd jobs to save some money and help Chillum, who cannot survive without drugs, especially after being sacked by Baba after a disastrous interview with a foreign journalist. Eventually, one of these odd jobs costs Krishna his job at the tea stall. To get more money, Krishna and his pals rob an elderly Parsi man by breaking into his house in broad daylight. Krishna eventually finds out that the money he had saved eventually has been stolen by Chillum for drugs, which he had overdosed on fatally.

One night, while returning home from work with friends, Krishna and Manju are apprehended by the police and taken to a juvenile home. Eventually, Krishna escapes and goes back to his world. He finds that a new recruit in Baba's drug business has taken Chillum's place and name. Krishna meets Sola Saal and tries to convince her to run away with him. She reveals that she is charmed by Baba and no longer interested in Krishna; she is driven away to service her first 'client'. Meanwhile, Rekha is told that the authorities will not release their daughter, because the mother is a prostitute. An angry Rekha decides to leave Baba, but Baba beats her in retaliation. She is saved by the timely intervention of Krishna who, in a fit of rage, kills Baba and attempts to run away with her, but they become separated in a parade honoring Ganesh. The film ends with a slow zoom in to Krishna's dejected face.

Cast

Shafiq Syed as Krishna, nicknamed Chaipau
Raghuvir Yadav as Chillum (credited as Raghubir Yadav)
Hansa Vithal as Manju
Anita Kanwar as Rekha
Nana Patekar as Baba
Chanda Sharma as Sola Saal, nicknamed Sweet Sixteen
Irrfan Khan as Letter writer
Sanjana Kapoor as Foreigner reporter

Pre-production

Writing and inspiration

Nair records that the initial inspiration for the film came from the spirit of Bombay's street children. Her ideas developed when she researched the lives of the children with her creative partner Sooni Taraporevala. From the beginning, they decided that real street children would play in the film since the combination of childhood and knowledge in their faces would be hard to find among professional child actors.

Nair was also inspired to make the film after watching Héctor Babenco's drama Pixote (1981). She said, "on the first day of shooting, I received the news that the child actor who played the character of Pixote was shot dead in the street. After this incident, I was more determined to make Salaam Bombay!, and decided to share the film's dividends with street children if we could." After making four documentaries, Salaam Bombay! was Nair's first full-length feature film.

Production

Most of the film Salaam Bombay! was shot on Falkland Road, a red light district in Kamathipura, Bombay.  The child actors in the film were real street children. The cast received drama training at a workshop in Bombay before they appeared in the film. A room was rented near the Grant Road railway station for rehearsals, where about 130 children rehearsed on the first day. Later, before appearing in the film, a group of 24 street children trained in a workshop, where they were given music, dance and acting training. Gradually the stories of the city of Bombay, their parents, sex, trafficking, drug dealing, gangs and their profiteering were learned from them. They were reunited with their families even before the film was shot. They were paid to pay for their medical treatment and work on the film, and some of that money was left as a fixed deposit. Irrfan Khan played the role of a letter writer in a two-minute scene in the film, which was his first appearance in a film.

After its release, director Nair established an organization called the Salaam Baalak Trust in 1989 to rehabilitate the children who appeared in the film. Dinaz Stafford, a child psychologist, worked with the children after the film. The Salaam Baalak Trust now lends support to street children in Bombay, Delhi and Bhubaneshwar. Shafiq Sayed, who played Krishna in the film, is currently living as an auto rickshaw driver in Bangalore.

Initially, Cadrage, Channel Four Films, Doordarshan, La Sept Cinéma, Mirabai Films and the National Film Development Corporation of India paid for the production of the film. Several producers co-produced the film with Nair, with Gabriel Auer from France as the executive producer, Michael Nozik from the UK and Anil Tejani from India and Cherry Rogers as the co-executive producers. Also in co-production were Jane Balfour and co-producer Mitch Epstein.

Post-production

Music and soundtrack
Salaam Bombay!: Music from the Original Motion Picture Soundtrack, of the film was composed, performed, and directed by L. Subramaniam, was released on cassette and CD versions in 1986 from DRG Music Publishing. The song "Mera Naam Chin Chin Choo" was written by Qamar Jalalabadi, composed by O. P. Nayyar and sung by Geeta Dutt for the 1958 film Howrah Bridge is included in the film soundtrack. Also in a scene at the movie theatre, Sridevi's dance to the song "Hawa Hawaii" sung by Kavita Krishnamurti from the 1987 film Mr. India is performed.

Track listing

Release

Initial screening
Before commercial release, the film premiered at the Directors' Fortnight at the Cannes Film Festival in May 1988. It was later screened at the Toronto International Film Festival on 13 September in 1988.

Initial theatrical run
In 1988, the film was released on 24 August in France, on September in India, on 7 October at the 26th New York Film Festival, on 20 December in Italy, and on 22 December in Belgium.

Following year, the film was released on 13 January in Denmark, 2 February in Netherlands, on 10 February in Finland, on 27 April in West Germany, on 29 June in Australia, on 27 July in Argentina, on 24 September at the Cinefest Sudbury International Film Festival in Canada and 3 November in Sweden.

In 1990, the film was released on 26 January in East Germany, on 10 March in Japan, and on 5 April in Hungary. Following year, the film was released on 18 January in Portugal.

Box office
Salaam Bombay! earned  in the United States and Canada, from 506,100 ticket sales. In France, the film sold 633,899 tickets; the average ticket price in 1988 was 34 francs, which is equivalent to 21,552,566francs. In Germany, the film sold 258,728 tickets; the average ticket price in 1989 was 9.5DM, which is equivalent to 2,457,916DM. The average exchange rate in 1988 was 1 US dollar equal to 1.585 Deutsche Mark, which is worth .

The film also sold 346 tickets in Switzerland and Spain since 1996, adding up to total overseas footfalls of  tickets sold in the United States, France, Germany, Switzerland and Spain.

Re-release
The film was re-released in France on 12 December 2001 and 7 January 2015. In 2005, it was also screened at the New Horizons Film Festival in Poland on 23 July. The film was re-released in Indian theatres in March 2013. In 2015, at the BFI London Film Festival, the film was screened on 9 October, and on 18 October at the Tallgrass Film Festival in the United States.

Critical reception

Salaam Bombay! mainly received positive reviews from critics who commented on the cultural and social impact of the film. On the film review aggregator website Rotten Tomatoes, the film has an approval rating of 93% based on 30 reviews, with a rating average of 7.8/10. The site's critical consensus reads, "Salaam Bombay! examines life in a part of the world that many viewers have never visited - but does so with enough compassion and grace to make them feel as if they have." At Metacritic, which assigns a weighted mean rating to reviews,  the film has a score of 78 based on 4 critics, indicating "generally favorable reviews".

Roger Ebert wrote, "The history of the making of "Salaam Bombay!" is almost as interesting as the film itself." English writer Hilary Mantel commented, "A warm and lively film, made by Mira Nair with only a handful of professional actors." Ted Shen of Chicago Reader wrote that, "like Hector Babenco's Pixote the film is unsparingly gritty, but with a woman's tenderness it also grants the characters an occasional moment of grace." Richard Corliss of Time magazine wrote that, "Salaam Bombay! deserves a broad audience, not just to open American eyes to plights of hunger and homelessness abroad, but to open American minds to the vitality of a cinema without rim shots and happy endings." American film critic Dave Kehr stated, "Much to Nair`s credit, she exploits neither the exoticism of her locale (there are no tour-guide, look-at-this flourishes) nor the misery of her subjects (suffer they may, but they do not demand pity)." American film critic David Sterritt stated, "the movie is terrifically well-acted and beautifully filmed, however, marking an auspicious feature-film debut for Indian-American director Mira Nair." Peter Travers commented that "poetic, powerful and disturbing, Salaam Bombay! transcends language and cultural barriers.

Emanuel Levy, thought that the film "drew its intensity and colour from its locale, the slums of Bombay." Vincent Canby says, "for a film about such hopelessness, Salaam Bombay! is surprisingly cheering." Christopher Null wrote, "with Salaam, Nair proves an early ability with a camera and at getting performances out of obviously inexperienced actors, but her writing talents are much sketchier." Rita Kempley of The Washington Post wrote, "Nair's film has been compared to Hector Babenco's chilling "Pixote," a Brazilian look at a 10-year-old street criminal, but hers is a more compassionate, though equally troubling, portrait." On movie review site Rediff.com critic Sukanya Verma commented, Salaam Bombay! "still brilliant in 25 years."

Accolades

See also
 Salaam Baalak Trust
 List of submissions to the 61st Academy Awards for Best Foreign Language Film
 List of Indian submissions for the Academy Award for Best Foreign Language Film

References

Sources

External links

1988 films
Films set in Mumbai
Films about organised crime in India
Films about poverty in India
1980s Hindi-language films
Films directed by Mira Nair
Films shot in Mumbai
Films about prostitution in India
Best Hindi Feature Film National Film Award winners
1988 crime drama films
Indian crime drama films
Caméra d'Or winners
1988 directorial debut films
Films with screenplays by Sooni Taraporevala
Film4 Productions films
Mirabai Films films
National Film Development Corporation of India films
Films scored by L. Subramaniam